Ernst Buschor (Hürben, 2 June 1886 – Munich, 11 December 1961) was a German archaeologist and translator.

Biography 
From 1905 he studied at the University of Munich as a pupil of classical archaeologist Adolf Furtwängler, earning his doctorate in 1912. After serving as a soldier in the Balkans during World War I, he became an associate professor of classical archaeology at the University of Erlangen. In 1920 he became a full professor at the University of Freiburg. From 1921 to 1929, he was director of the German Archaeological Institute at Athens. From 1929 to 1959, he served as a professor of classical archaeology at Munich.

From 1922 to 1924, he conducted archaeological excavations in Athens, Olympia and in Amyklai (Sparta), and for many years served as director of excavations on the island of Samos (1925–1939; 1951–1961). In 1921 he became a full member of the Bavarian Academy of Sciences.

Selected works 
Buschor is credited for providing translations of all 31 extant tragedies of Aeschylus, Sophocles and Euripides. The following are a few of his significant writings:
 Griechische Vasenmalerei (= Klassische Illustratoren 5). Piper, München 1913. Translated into English as: Greek vase-painting; London, Chatto & Windus [1921].
 Beiträge zur Geschichte der griechischen Textilkunst. Die Anfänge und der orientalische Import. Kastner & Callwey, München 1912 (München, Universität, phil. Dissertation, 26. Januar 1912) – Contributions to the history of Greek textile art. 
 Euripides: Orestes. Iphigenie in Aulis. Die Maenaden. 3 Tragoedien. Beck, München 1960 – Euripides: Orestes. Iphigénie in Aulis. The Maenads;  3 tragedies.
 Winke für Akropolispilger. Beck, München 1960 – Hints for Acropolis pilgrims.
 Gesamtausgabe der griechischen Tragödien. 10 Bände. Artemis Verlag, Zürich u. a. 1979,  – Edition of the Greek tragedies. Translated by Ernst Buschor. 10 volumes.
 Vom Sinn der griechischen Standbilder, Translated into English as: On the meaning of Greek statues; Amherst : University of Massachusetts Press, 1980.

Bibliography 
 Karl Schefold: Ernst Buschor 1886–1961. In: Archäologenbildnisse. Porträts und Kurzbiographien von Klassischen Archäologen deutscher Sprache. von Zabern, Mainz 1988, S. 234–235.

References and external links 
 
Books by Ernst Buschor at Project Gutenberg

1886 births
1981 deaths
People from Günzburg (district)
Academic staff of the University of Erlangen-Nuremberg
Academic staff of the University of Freiburg
Ludwig Maximilian University of Munich alumni
Academic staff of the Ludwig Maximilian University of Munich
Archaeologists from Bavaria
German classical philologists
Translators from Greek
Translators to German
German male non-fiction writers
Recipients of the Pour le Mérite (civil class)
Members of the German Academy of Sciences at Berlin
20th-century German translators